Blaniulus is a genus of millipedes containing the following species:

Blaniulus atticus Verhoeff, 1925
Blaniulus concolor Brölemann, 1894
Blaniulus drahoni Giard, 1899
Blaniulus eulophus Silvestri, 1903
Blaniulus fuscopunctatus Lucas, 1846
Blaniulus guttulatus (Bosc, 1792)
Blaniulus lichtensteini Brölemann, 1921
Blaniulus lorifer Brölemann, 1921
Blaniulus mayeti (Brölemann, 1902)
Blaniulus orientalis Brölemann, 1921
Blaniulus pallidus Fedrizzi, 1878
Blaniulus troglobius Latzel, 1886
Blaniulus troglodites Brölemann, 1898
Blaniulus velatus Ribaut, 1954
Blaniulus virei Brölemann, 1900

References

Julida
Millipede genera